HtrA2 peptidase (high temperature requirement protein A2, HtrA2, Omi stress-regulated endoprotease, serine proteinase OMI, OMI/HtrA2 protease, HtrA2/Omi, Omi/HtrA2) is an enzyme. This enzyme catalyses the following chemical reaction

 Cleavage of non-polar aliphatic amino-acids at the P1 position, with a preference for Val, Ile and Met.

This enzyme is upregulated in mammalian cells in response to stress induced by heat shock and tunicamycin treatment.

References

External links 
 

EC 3.4.21